Gabe Logan Newell (born November 3, 1962), nicknamed Gaben, is an American businessman and the president of the video game company Valve.

Newell was born in Colorado and grew up in Davis, California. He attended Harvard University in the early 1980s but dropped out to join Microsoft, where he helped create the first versions of the Windows operating system. He and another employee, Mike Harrington, left Microsoft in 1996 to found Valve, and funded development of their first game, Half-Life (1998). Harrington left in 2000, leaving Newell as the sole owner. As of 2021, he owned at least one quarter of Valve.

Newell led development of Valve's digital distribution service Steam, which launched in 2003 and controlled most of the market for downloaded PC games by 2011. He is one of the wealthiest people in the United States; in December 2021, Forbes estimated his net worth at US$3.9 billion.

Early life and education 
Newell was born on November 3, 1962, in Colorado, and attended Davis Senior High School in Davis, California. He worked as a paperboy, and later a telegram messenger for Western Union. He enrolled at Harvard University in 1980, but was convinced to drop out to work for Bill Gates at Microsoft by the head of sales in 1983.

Career

Microsoft 
Newell spent 13 years at Microsoft as the producer of the first three releases of the Windows operating systems. Newell later said he learned more during his first three months at Microsoft than he ever did at Harvard, which was one of the primary reasons why he dropped out.

In late 1995, Doom, a 1993 first-person shooter game developed by id Software, was estimated to be installed on more computers worldwide than Microsoft's new operating system, Windows 95. Newell said: "[id] ... didn't even distribute through retail, it distributed through bulletin boards and other pre-internet mechanisms. To me, that was a lightning bolt. Microsoft was hiring 500-people sales teams and this entire company was 12 people, yet it had created the most widely distributed software in the world. There was a sea change coming." At Microsoft, Newell led development on a port of Doom for Windows 95; the port is credited for helping make Windows a viable game platform.

Valve 

Inspired by Michael Abrash, who left Microsoft to work on the game Quake at id, Newell and another employee, Mike Harrington, left Microsoft to found the video game company Valve on August 24, 1996. Newell and Harrington funded development of the first Valve game, the first-person shooter Half-Life (1998), which was a critical and commercial success. Harrington left in 2000, leaving Newell as the sole owner.

Newell gave Valve no deadline and a "virtually unlimited" budget to develop Half-Life 2 (2004), promising to fund it himself if necessary. Meanwhile, he spent several months developing Steam, a digital distribution service for games. By 2011, Steam controlled between 50% and 70% of the market for downloaded PC games and generated most of Valve's revenue. In December 2010, Forbes named Newell "A Name You Should Know", primarily for his work on Steam having partnerships with multiple major developers.

In 2007, Newell expressed his displeasure over developing software for game consoles, saying that developing processes for Sony's PlayStation 3 was a "waste of everybody's time" He appeared on stage at Sony's keynote at E3 2010; while acknowledging his criticism of console development, he discussed the open nature of the PlayStation 3 and announced Portal 2 for the console, remarking that with Steamworks support it would be the best version for any console. Newell also criticized the Xbox Live service, referring to it as a "train wreck", and was also critical of Windows 8, calling it a threat to the open nature of PC gaming. At the 2013 LinuxCon, Newell said that the Linux operating system and open source development were "the future of gaming". He accused the proprietary systems of companies such as Microsoft and Apple of stifling innovation through sluggish certification processes. 

In 2013, Newell was added to the Academy of Interactive Arts & Sciences Hall of Fame. That March, he received the BAFTA Fellowship award for his contributions to the video game industry. In October 2017, Forbes listed Newell among the 100 wealthiest people in the United States, with an estimated net worth of 5.5billion. In December 2021, Forbes estimated that Newell had a net worth of US$3.9 billion and owned at least one quarter of Valve. According to Charlie Fish, author of The History of Video Games, as of 2021 Newell was the richest person in the video game industry.

Personal life 

Newell formerly suffered from Fuchs' dystrophy, a congenital disease which affects the cornea, but was cured by two cornea transplants in 2006 and 2007. He married Lisa Mennet on the same day he founded Valve with Harrington. They have two sons. The birth of his eldest son in the late 1990s served as inspiration for the final boss of Half-Life, as the couple considered childbirth to be the most frightening thing they could think of at the time. As of 2019, Newell and Mennet had divorced.

In 2011, Newell said his favorite video games included Super Mario 64, Doom, and a Burroughs mainframe version of Star Trek. Doom convinced him that games were the future of entertainment, and Super Mario 64 convinced him that games are a form of art. Newell is a fan of the animated series My Little Pony: Friendship Is Magic. Newell also recorded a voice pack for Dota 2, a Valve-developed game, which referenced many previous statements and phrases from himself in a humorous manner.

Within the gaming community, Newell has the nickname Gaben, derived from his work email address. Newell said that he has tried to grow into his public image: "They hug me when they run into me. I'm not a hugging person, but that's what they want. I was with my kids the first time that happened in public, and my kids were pretty cool with it. But I wasn't. 'Dad, roll with it.' Even now, I'm learning from our customers."

In 2020, during the COVID-19 pandemic, Newell resided in New Zealand with a group of friends electing to stay in Auckland rather than returning to Seattle once airlines travel restrictions were eased. As an expression of gratitude for New Zealand's hospitality, Newell and others planned a free event, "We Love Aotearoa", with live performances from musical artists across New Zealand. This was accompanied by VR stands for Valve games such as Half-Life: Alyx and The Lab. The event was postponed from August to December due to a lockdown induced by a second wave of COVID-19 in the country. In October, Newell applied for permanent residency in New Zealand, but said he did not intend to take Valve offices with him. In 2021, he returned to Valve in Seattle.

References

Further reading

External links 

 
 

1962 births
Living people
Academy of Interactive Arts & Sciences Hall of Fame inductees
American billionaires
American computer businesspeople
American technology chief executives
American technology company founders
American video game designers
BAFTA fellows
Harvard University alumni
Microsoft employees
Microsoft Windows people
Valve Corporation people
Video game producers
People from Davis, California
Davis Senior High School (California) alumni
Game Developers Conference Pioneer Award recipients